Shazi Visram is an American entrepreneur, investor, and philanthropist, best known as the founder, CEO, and Chief Mom of Happy Family Brands. In 2013, she was acknowledged by President Barack Obama as "not only an outstanding businesswoman, but also a leader that all of us can emulate."

Early life and education 
Visram was born in Toronto to immigrants from Pakistan and Tanzania. At the age of three, she moved with her parents and brother to Birmingham, Alabama, where they lived in a room at the motel the family operated. Visram says that owning their own business was her parents’ biggest source of both stress and pride. She credits her entrepreneurial parents for their example.

Visram graduated from Indian Springs School in Indian Springs, AL before attending Columbia University, where she received her BA in History and Visual Arts in 1999, and later her MBA from Columbia Business School (‘04) in Management and Entrepreneurship.

In 1999, Visram was the first employee in Horizon Media's interactive division. Following her time at Horizon, Visram founded Maven Marketing, her own digital marketing and media consultancy.

Career

Founding Happy Family 
While attending Columbia Business School, Visram began writing her business plan for Happy Family after chatting with a friend, who admitted to feeling guilty about not being able to make homemade food for her babies. Visram discovered that many parents wanted access to healthy, organic options that weren't available at that time.

After a brief round of investment from family and friends—the first person to write a check to the company was Visram's mother, Zarin—Visram raised $23 million from 186 individual investors from 2004 to 2012, including Honest Tea CEO Seth Goldman, chef Tom Colicchio, and actress Demi Moore.

2006–2013: Growth, initiatives, and sale to Danone 
In 2006, Visram, along with Founding Partner and COO Jessica Rolph, formally launched Happy Family, known at the time as Happy Baby. In May 2013, Visram sold 92% of the company to Groupe Danone, noting "the broader opportunity we weren't able to tap into" provided by Danone to bring more than 100 products to market in 34 countries. Following the sale, Visram remained CEO until December 2017.

2014–present 
In 2014, Visram partnered with The Small Things to open the Happy Family Children’s Village, in memory of her father, Amir Visram. The village, which housed 45 children as of 2016, provides education and nutrition to Tanzanian children separated from their families, and prepares them to assume leadership roles in their communities. Upon the opening, Visram said, “I believe that all children deserve to be happy, and oftentimes that starts with the little things, like access to nutritious food and a proper education.”

Under Visram in 2016, Happy Family launched the first see-through organic baby food pouch—Happy Baby Clearly Crafted—a development followed by rival baby food brands. 2016 also saw the publication of Visram’s second book, “The Happy Family Organic Superfoods Cookbook for Baby & Toddler” with Cricket Azima.

The following year, in 2017, Happy Family released a new organic infant formula and “infant support platform with expert resources and premium products,” along with the Happy Mama Milk Mentors, a support team for breastfeeding moms. About the correlation between the two, Visram said, “No matter what, we believe we need to be there for parents at every turn to support the individual choices that work for their very individual families.”

Happy Family generated revenue surpassing $150 million for the first time in 2017. Visram envisions the company as a billion dollar brand. In December 2017, Visram transitioned from her position as CEO of Happy Family, while maintaining her role as chief visionary and "Chairmom" of the board.

Philanthropy 
In addition to her work with Happy Family, Visram serves on the Board of Overseers at Columbia Business School and works with the Network for Teaching Entrepreneurship (NFTE) as a mentor to young entrepreneurs from low-income communities.

Visram is also an avid supporter of Talk About Curing Autism (TACA), a commitment constantly reaffirmed by the motivation she gets from her son Zane, whose regressive case of autism was diagnosed when he was two and a half. Visram said, "I think the most significant thing I feel is this immense desire to protect them, especially Zane who just needs so much support and love. I believe it's why I feel a need to be a voice for him and all kids who are wired differently."

Visram is a mentor for startups and an impact venture investor, with investments including EpiBone, Ovia Health (a Femtech company, co-founded by Paris Wallace, Alex Baron and Gina Nebesar), Recycle Track Systems, Simple Mills, and Bulletproof. She is also a Strategic Advisor at wearable breast pump maker, Willow.

As a businesswoman and mother, Visram has also spoken out on the importance of generous parental leave policies and the need for CEOs and other executives to lead by example.

Personal life 
Visram lives in Connecticut with her husband Joe and two children, Zane and Asha. In 2009, she and her family’s story was featured in American Express’s “Shine a Light” broadcast campaign, which aired during the Super Bowl and Golden Globes.

Recognition and awards 
 An Inc. 500 Fastest Growing Company
 New York Region Entrepreneur of the Year (Ernst & Young, 2011)
 Top Ten Female Entrepreneurs (Inc. Magazine, 2011)
 Moms Who Are Changing the World Nominee (Babble, 2011)
 Crain’s New York Business 40 Under 40 (2012)
 Rockstar of the New Economy (Fast Company, 2012)
 Young Global Leader Class Member (World Economic Forum, 2013)
 Innovator of the Year (Stevie Awards, 2016)
 Distinguished Early Achievement Award (Columbia Business School, 2016)
 20 Most Influential Moms of the Year (FamilyCircle, 2017)

References

External links 
 
 
 
 

Living people
Canadian emigrants to the United States
Canadian people of Gujarati descent
Canadian Ismailis
Canadian businesspeople of Pakistani descent
Canadian women business executives
American women chief executives
American women company founders
American company founders
Businesspeople from Birmingham, Alabama
Businesspeople from Toronto
1976 births
Columbia College (New York) alumni
Columbia Business School alumni
21st-century American women